Royal Air Force Prestatyn or more simply RAF Prestatyn is a former Royal Air Force radar post situated near Prestatyn, in Denbighshire, north-east Wales.  The remains of some of the buildings are current.  The rotor station is visible as a square building from most of Prestatyn, as it is situated on Gwaenysgor hill.  The area around the post is fenced off as a TV satellite is alongside the buildings.

The radar site was last used in the late 1960s and is now used by Prestatyn Rifle and Pistol target shooting club as their home range 

There was once a gun turret mounted out to sea that had a range of up to 5 km.

References

Buildings and structures in Denbighshire
Prestatyn
Prestatyn